Chocomotive is the second album led by saxophonist Houston Person which was recorded in 1967 and released on the Prestige label.

Reception

Allmusic awarded the album 4 stars stating "Some jazz improvisers believe that appealing to R&B and pop fans is beneath them, but Houston Person never had that elitist mentality. The big-toned tenor titan was always a communicator; though he has first-rate chops and can easily sail through difficult bop changes, Person doesn't value pyrotechnics over feeling and emotion. Consequently, albums like Chocomotive have managed to reach a lot of R&B and pop fans who don't necessarily buy a lot of jazz".

Track listing 
All compositions by Cedar Walton except where noted.
 "Chocomotive" – 7:48   
 "You're Gonna Hear From Me" (André Previn) – 3:48   
 "Close Quarters" – 7:39   
 "Girl Talk" (Neal Hefti, Bobby Troup) – 3:38   
 "Since I Fell for You" (Buddy Johnson) – 8:32   
 "Up, Up and Away" (Jimmy Webb) – 4:45   
 "More" (Riz Ortolani, Nino Oliviero) – 8:15

Personnel 
Houston Person – tenor saxophone
Cedar Walton – piano
Bob Cranshaw – bass
Alan Dawson – vibraphone 
Frank Jones – drums

References 

Houston Person albums
1967 albums
Prestige Records albums
Albums produced by Don Schlitten